Judah and La Playa station (often called Ocean Beach) is a light rail stop that serves as the western terminus of the Muni Metro N Judah line. It is located in the Sunset District neighborhood adjacent to the Great Highway and Ocean Beach. The station has functioned as the terminus of the N Judah line since October 21, 1928. The station has a mini-high platform which provides access to people with disabilities, but most passengers load trains from the street, crossing a lane of traffic to reach the sidewalks.

Station layout 

The station consists of a single-track balloon loop with a small handicapped-accessible platform on its southern side. Passengers not needing the accessible platform board and alight from trains east of the loop on the west side of 48th Avenue. A short siding, used to store and turn back trains, is located inside the loop and connects to the westbound track. When the loop is out of service, trains can turn back using a crossover between 48th Avenue and La Playa.

In March 2014, Muni released details of the proposed implementation of their Transit Effectiveness Project (later rebranded MuniForward), which included a variety of stop changes for the N Judah line. Under that plan—which will be implemented as the N Judah Rapid Project—an inbound boarding island will be built at 48th Avenue, and an outbound transit bulb will be added at La Playa.

References

External links 
 
 inbound and outbound—SFMTA: Judah and La Playa (Ocean Beach)
 Judah/La Playa/Ocean Beach—SFBay Transit (unofficial)

Muni Metro stations
Railway stations in the United States opened in 1928
Sunset District, San Francisco